Heldeberg Designs was an American aircraft manufacturer, headquartered in Altamont, New York. The company specialized in powered parachutes.

Originally marketing under its own name, the company marketed its aircraft under the band name Blue Heron Powered Parachutes.

The company ceased manufacturing the Blue Heron line of powered parachutes in 2010. By early 2013 the company website stated: "After over 17 years of serving the aviation community, Heldeberg Designs LLC is wrapping up  operations and will no longer be manufacturing Blue Heron Powered Parachutes nor parts. We would like to thank all of our patrons and feel fortunate to have made so many friends around the world."

Aircraft

References

External links

Defunct aircraft manufacturers of the United States
Powered parachutes